Muret (in Gascon Occitan Murèth) is a commune in the Haute-Garonne department, of which it is a subprefecture, in the Occitanie region of southwestern France. Its inhabitants are called Muretains.

It is an outer suburb of the city of Toulouse, even though it is not in the region of Toulouse Métropole, which it has declined to join. It lies southwest of Toulouse and is the largest component of the intercommunality of Le Muretain Agglo.

Muret is generally known for the Battle of Muret (1213) and as the birthplace of the Renaissance humanist Muretus (1526-1585) and of Clément Ader (1841-1925), inventor and aviation pioneer.

Geography

Localities and hamlets
, Estantens, Cupidou.

Communal borders

Geology and relief
The commune is established on the first  on its left bank. Its right bank is overhung by a steep slope which deeply cut the molasse of the Tertiary era.

Transport
By rail: By the SNCF, Gare de Muret TER Occitanie on the Toulouse - Bayonne line.
By bus: By the  network,  Tisséo and the TAMtam network.
Several Tisséo bus routes connect the commune to the Toulouse Metro, including:

Hydrography
Muret is located on the Garonne river at its confluence with the Louge, which flows northeast through the commune. The Garonne flows north through the commune and forms part of its northern border.

Climate
Muret has an oceanic temperate climate, with Mediterranean and continental influences, characterised by a hot, dry summer, mild winter and a spring marked by heavy rains and severe thunderstorms.

Muret has averaged 24 days of extreme heat and 33 days of frost per year. The rainiest months are April, May and June.

History

Prehistory and antiquity
Various discoveries by local archaeologists suggest that the territory of Muret was populated as early as the Neolithic period: A hut foundation dating from 4000 BC has been unearthed to the north of the town. Different objects in the Chalcolithic, around 3,000 to 2,500 BC; then the Bronze Age from 1,700 BC indicate the permanence of the population here. A series of Gallo-Roman brick kilns dating back to the 1st century AD is located along the right bank of the Garonne. A villa occupied the site of the current town centre; surrounded by protective walls it was given the name of Murellum, which became Murel, and then Muret in the Middle Ages.

Middle Ages

On 12 September 1213 the Battle of Muret took place between Simon de Montfort and a coalition force under the control of Count Raymond of Toulouse, and King Peter II of Aragon. Muret entered history. That day, the battle changed the horizons of both sides of the Pyrenean border and saw the fate of Occitania decided. In an era where feudal entities (including the Count of Toulouse and his allies) still believed that they were able to play a role in the control of the southern areas on both slopes of the Pyrenees, the lords of the north of France, who spearheaded the Albigensian Crusade, attempted to impose themselves upon the south and eliminate Catharism.

De Montfort had been fighting Albigensian heretics during the Albigensian Crusade, when he was besieged by the vastly superior coalition army. Refusing to surrender or be starved into submission, de Montfort went on the offensive. Leading his knights out of the town, he proceeded to position them in a wide arc, then fell upon the Toulouse cavalry with a noise like a whole forest going down under the axe. Next to fall before the Crusader army was the Aragonian cavalry, where King Peter himself fell to the sword. After this, all that was left was to scatter the remaining cavalry defending the coalition camp before turning on the infantry that had been besieging Muret's walls. Despite their overwhelming advantage in numbers,the coalition army numbering almost 34,000 men was destroyed by de Montfort's army of only 2,100. The siege of Muret was lifted.

7,000-20,000 coalition troops were killed compared to a handful of casualties for de Monfort's army.

So it was at Muret, on 12 September 1213, where King Peter II of Aragon who came to reinforce the local Occitan forces, lost his life. This defeat of the Occitano-Aragonese troops heralded the annexation of the Languedoc to the Crown of France and the end of Catharism.

World War II

Heraldry

Politics and administration

Political trends and outcomes

List of mayors

Judicial and administrative proceedings

International relations

Muret is twinned with:
 Monzón, Spain
 Hertford, Hertfordshire, United Kingdom

Demography
In 2017, the commune had 24,945 inhabitants.

Economy
Muret is a true centrality in the area of life and activity of the Muretain, near Toulouse. Its stable economic fabric is composed primarily of small and medium-sized enterprises and industries, covering many sectors of activities. The economic development jurisdiction is exercised by the Agglomération Community of Muretain, which develops and consolidates the local economic fabric, and helps the creation of enterprises for the benefit of employment.

Muret has important reserves mainly located on the areas of activities of the territory.

Muret Gateway:  located north of the town, at the junction of the A64 exit.

Cap Clément Ader / Les Bonnets: Adjacent to the Muret-Lherm airport, with in its centre, the international karting.
Joffrery:  at the northern entrance of Muret.
Sans Soucis:  at the northern boundary of the town.

Industry

Laboratoires Pierre Fabre

Services
: 
, specialised in long sentences. Bertrand Cantat, was held in this centre from 28 September 2004 to 15 October 2007 for the killing of his girlfriend, the actress Marie Trintignant.

Infrastructure
Muret – Lherm Aerodrome
Gare de Muret
TDF transmitter

Personalities linked to the commune
Peter II of Aragon, (1177?-1213), King of the Crown of Aragon-Catalonia, died at the Battle of Muret. A high school in the town bears his name.

Adolphe Niel (1802-1869), Marshal of France (1859) and Minister of War underNapoleon III
 (1846-1918), son of the Marshal, general of brigade (1897), was buried at Muret as his parents and his cousins, the Niels of Brioudes.

Nicolas Dalayrac (1753-1809), composer of comic operas.
Clément Ader (1841-1925), inventor
Vincent Auriol (1884-1966), Mayor of Muret (1925), first President of the Fourth Republic, and his wife,  (1896-1979)
Guillaume Ibos (1860-1952), tenor
Charles de Rémusat (1797-1875), politician and philosopher, deputy of Muret.
Marc-Antoine Muret, humanist, (1526-1585).
Saint Germerius,  (circa 691 AD).
Christian Jeanpierre (1965-), sports presenter on TF1, presenter of Téléfoot.
Louis-Noël Belaubre, pianist and composer (1932).
 (1746-1802), Member of the Estates General.
, deputy, died at Muret
Manon André, Rugby Union player
, actress, died at Muret
, politician died at Muret
, politician died at Muret
, singer, primarily in Occitan
, born in Muret
Albert van Schendel and Antoon van Schendel, road bicycle riders, died at Muret
Sharaf Ibn Daha Anissa, Born in Muret, studied in Muret, will probably die there too.

Monuments and tourist sights

Historic monuments
The Church of Santiago de Muret, main monument of the town: It was built in the 12th century through the Counts of Comminges who made wall their principal residence. It is redesigned and enlarged in the 14th and 15th centuries. Particularly noteworthy is its octagonal steeple of Toulouse type. It is classified as early as 1928. In 1538 - 1548, a large vaulted choir was added at the end of the panelled Gothic nave. Its decor is restored after the depredations of the Revolution, under the first Empire, in a neo-classical style and side chapels were built.
House of 1823, 30 Rue Clément-Ader
Clément Ader Park
The Château de Cadeilhac
The Château de Rudelle is a 16th and 17th century castle. Privately owned, it is inscribed on the list of historic monuments, listed as an historic site by the French Ministry of Culture.</ref>

The , organised by commune.

Other monuments and sites
Domain of Brioudes
Statue of Marshal Niel
Chapel of Saint-Amans of Estantens
Château de Montégut-Ségla where  lived
Jean Jaurès Park
Clement Ader Park

Local life

Public service
Muret has a subprefecture, a gendarmerie, a post office, tax office, a retirement home, a  centre assigned to the A64 autoroute and a tourist office.

Health

Education
Education is provided at the commune of Muret's creche, passing through ,  and collège until the lycée high school and  all being complemented by the municipal library and outdoor centre. The city is also home to a branch of the National School of civil aviation.

Culture
Muret has multiple cultural facilities, including:

François Mitterrand Media Library
Clément-Ader Museum
Cinema
The Nicolas-Daylarac municipal school of art teaching
Contemporary art gallery Duniya The World Of

Muret is home for the well-known Francophone literary award Prix du jeune écrivain de langue française, founded in 1984.

Sports
Muret offers more than 100 sport and leisure events per year. Its facilities are many and varied: Gymnasiums, tennis courts, recreation area with a fitness trail, two landscaped lakes, international karting, an aerodrome, a canoeing facility, three bowling facilities, a skate park, two shooting ranges, a velodrome, a riding club and the Aqualudia, the Muretain swimming centre with its six indoor and outdoor pools.

Muret has more than 50 sporting associations, including:

Avenir Muretain XV, Rugby union club which plays in Fédérale 3.
, football club which played in the Championnat National (3rd division) and the AS Muret women's team.
Texman, bridge club with 120 members.
The  took place at Muret.
The  American football team.

Muret will also host the departure for Stage 13 of cycling's 2015 Tour de France on 17 July, with a  route to Rodez.

Worship

Catholic
The town is part of the pastoral sector of Muret, which includes the parishes of Saint-Jacques, Saint-Jean, and the parishes of the villages: Estantens, Le Fauga, Eaunes and Saint-Hilaire. Father Joseph Coltro is the senior priest of this pastoral area.

Protestant
The cultural association of the Evangelical Church in Muret occupies premises located at 12 Chemin de la Pyramide, inaugurated in November 2012 after a year of work. The pastor is Bernard Gisquet.

Muslim
The Association of Franco-Muslim culture and worship of Muret (AFMCCM) acquired the premises of a former locksmith, Rue Marclan, in an industrial area north of Muret, in 2000, for the founding of the mosque of Muret.

Ecology and recycling

There is a recycling centre in the commune.

See also
Communes of the Haute-Garonne department

Parc naturel régional des Landes de Gascogne

TER Midi-Pyrénées
Battle of Muret
Maquis de Rieumes

References

External links

  

Communes of Haute-Garonne
Subprefectures in France
Comminges